Stefan Salinger (born 22 December 1965) is an Austrian male curler.

Teams

References

External links

Living people
1965 births
Austrian male curlers

Place of birth missing (living people)